was a softcore porn Japanese variety TV show broadcast from October 1991 to March 1998. Airing early Sunday mornings at 1:15 a.m. JST on TV Tokyo, the hour-long show helped launch the career of one of its late hosts, Ai Iijima, who afterwards moved into a more mainstream career.

Description
Gilgamesh was a long-running example of the late-night sexy programming popular on Japanese television.

The show was in the format of a variety show. Segments included "Yashoku Banzai", a cooking corner with Yuuki Hitomi wearing just an apron; shiatsu with Jeff Furukawa; "Bathtub Cinema", in which a nude young woman in a bathtub reviewed a current film; and "No-Panty Pub Report", in which the television crew would visit a Tokyo bar featuring waitresses without undergarments.

Cast

 Reiko Hayama
 Yuki Hitomi
 Fumie Hosokawa
 Ai Iijima
 Asami Jō
 Anna Kazuki
 Rina Kitahara
 Akira Kiuchi
 Sena Matsuda
 Kei Mizutani
 Shoot Ogawa (1997)
 Kaori Ōhara
 Ijiri Okada
 Tamao Sato
 Masaya Yamazaki
 Nami Yasumuro

References

External links
 

1990s Japanese television series
1991 Japanese television series debuts
1998 Japanese television series endings
Japanese pornography
Japanese variety television shows
Softcore pornography
TV Tokyo original programming